Trysull and Seisdon is a civil parish in the district of South Staffordshire, Staffordshire, England. It contains 22 listed buildings that are recorded in the National Heritage List for England. Of these, one is at Grade II*, the middle of the three grades, and the others are at Grade II, the lowest grade.  The parish contains the villages of Trysull and Seisdon and the surrounding countryside.  All the listed buildings are in the villages, apart from a lock on the Staffordshire and Worcestershire Canal and a bridge crossing it.  Most of the listed buildings are houses, cottages, farmhouses and farm buildings, the earlier of which are timber framed.  The other listed buildings include a church, a public house, two road bridges, two mills, and a war memorial.


Key

Buildings

References

Citations

Sources

Lists of listed buildings in Staffordshire
South Staffordshire District